Events from the year 1699 in Ireland.

Incumbent
Monarch: William III

Events
January 26–June 14 – the Parliament of Ireland meets and enacts legislation to levy duties on exported woolens; to encourage the construction of parsonages; to oblige landowners to plant and conserve trees; and to prevent Roman Catholics from becoming solicitors.
February 1 – the Parliament of England requires the disbandment of foreign troops in Ireland.
May 4 – the Parliament of England enacts legislation providing for the appointment of a commission of inquiry into the administration of forfeited estates in Ireland.
A Roman Catholic English language New Testament is probably printed in Dublin at about this date, but all copies appear to have been suppressed.

Arts and literature
c. July–August – the Welsh scholar Edward Lhuyd first travels in Ireland.
Publication of The Dublin Scuffle: being a challenge sent by John Dunton, citizen of London, to Patrick Campbel, bookseller in Dublin.

Births

September 26 – Charles Macklin, actor and dramatist (d. 1797)
Sir Richard Butler, 5th Baronet, politician (d. 1771)
Edward Lovett Pearce, architect (d. 1733)
Isaac Wayne, tanner (d. 1774 in the Province of Pennsylvania)

Deaths
April 6 – Sir Richard Nagle, lawyer and politician (b. 1636)
June 18 – Popham Seymour-Conway, landowner (b. 1675) (result of a drunken duel)
Michael Hill, politician (b. 1672)
Dudley Persse, landowner (b. 1625)

References

 
1690s in Ireland
Ireland
Years of the 17th century in Ireland